Jasmin Mecinovikj (born 22 October 1990) is a Macedonian professional footballer who plays as a centre-back for Ferizaj.

Club career

Melaka United
On 17 May 2017, Mecinovikj signed a contract with Malaysian side Melaka United. He made his debut in a 1–1 draw against PKNS where he collected a red card in that match. On 27 September 2017, he scored his first goal for the club in a 2–1 win over Selangor.

Nejmeh
After being released by Melaka, Mecinovikj signed with Lebanese Premier League club Nejmeh SC for the 2018 season. However due to severe injuries, he mutually terminated his contract with the club in May 2018.

Rudar Pljevlja
On 26 January 2019, Mecinovikj was announced as the new player of FK Rudar Pljevlja.

References

External links
 

1990 births
Living people
Sportspeople from Čačak
Association football central defenders
Macedonian footballers
North Macedonia under-21 international footballers
FK Skopje players
FC Sheriff Tiraspol players
FC Tiraspol players
Sogndal Fotball players
Egri FC players
Lombard-Pápa TFC footballers
FK Makedonija Gjorče Petrov players
FK Renova players
FC Urartu players
FK Pelister players
Melaka United F.C. players
Nejmeh SC players
KF Trepça'89 players
FK Rudar Pljevlja players
FK Podgorica players
Persela Lamongan players
FC Struga players
Macedonian First Football League players
Moldovan Super Liga players
Eliteserien players
Nemzeti Bajnokság I players
Armenian Premier League players
Malaysia Super League players
Lebanese Premier League players
Football Superleague of Kosovo players
Montenegrin First League players
Liga 1 (Indonesia) players
Macedonian expatriate footballers
Expatriate footballers in Moldova
Expatriate footballers in Norway
Expatriate footballers in Hungary
Expatriate footballers in Armenia
Expatriate footballers in Malaysia
Expatriate footballers in Lebanon
Expatriate footballers in Kosovo
Expatriate footballers in Montenegro
Expatriate footballers in Indonesia
Macedonian expatriate sportspeople in Moldova
Macedonian expatriate sportspeople in Norway
Macedonian expatriate sportspeople in Hungary
Macedonian expatriate sportspeople in Armenia
Macedonian expatriate sportspeople in Malaysia
Macedonian expatriate sportspeople in Lebanon
Macedonian expatriate sportspeople in Kosovo
Macedonian expatriate sportspeople in Montenegro
Macedonian expatriate sportspeople in Indonesia
Bangladesh Football Premier League players
Mohammedan SC (Dhaka) players